Samantha Deitsch (born February 14, 2003) is an American author and gun control activist who survived the Stoneman Douglas High School shooting in 2018.

Early life 
Samantha Deitsch was born on February 14, 2003. She started attending Marjory Stoneman Douglas High School in 2017. Deitsch was a freshman at Marjorie Stoneman Douglas High School when the mass shooting occurred in 2018. She was friends with one of the victims, Jaime Guttenberg. She is the younger sister of film director Matt Deitsch and activist Ryan Deitsch.

Gun control advocacy 
After the Stoneman Douglas High School shooting, Deitsch and her older brothers started to embark on gun control advocacy with March For Our Lives. She co-founded the organization and helped contribute to Glimmer of Hope, a book about the activism after the shooting. Prior to her gun control advocacy, Deitsch described herself as not politically active.

Political views 
In 2019, Broward County, Florida, adopted a Text-to-9-1-1 system and Deitsch expressed her support for the new system: "Being able to text 911 is a necessary addition to pre-existing public safety resources".

Bibliography

References

External links 

Living people
2003 births
American gun control activists
American political activists
Place of birth missing (living people)
Organization founders
Gun politics in the United States
Jewish American writers
Writers from Florida
Youth activists
American child activists
People from Parkland, Florida
Stoneman Douglas High School shooting activists